The Baltimore Skipjacks were a minor league professional ice hockey team from Baltimore, Maryland, United States. The Skipjacks originated in 1979, and played as the Baltimore Clippers in the Eastern Hockey League for two seasons. The team was renamed to Skipjacks in 1981, and played the following season in the Atlantic Coast Hockey League. The Skipjacks then played eleven seasons as members of the American Hockey League (AHL), from 1982 until 1993. The Skipjacks were one of three AHL teams to have been based in Baltimore, including the Baltimore Clippers, and the Baltimore Bandits. The Skipjacks operated as a farm team to the Pittsburgh Penguins and Washington Capitals for five seasons each, and were previously a farm team to the Minnesota North Stars for two seasons, the Boston Bruins for one season. The team played its home games at the Baltimore Civic Center, which was renamed to the Baltimore Arena in 1986.

Gene Ubriaco was the team's head coach for seven seasons, and won the AHL Coach of the Year Award during the 1983–84 AHL season, when he led the Skipjacks to a division title. The Skipjacks reached the Calder Cup finals in the 1984–85 AHL season, but were defeated by the Sherbrooke Canadiens. In the same season, Jon Casey won the AHL Goaltender of the Year Award and led the AHL in goals against average. Mitch Lamoureux is the Skipjacks career leader in goals (119), assists (133), and points (252), and was inducted into the AHL Hall of Fame.

The Skipjacks relocated from Baltimore in 1993, and became the Portland Pirates.

Eastern Hockey League

When the Southern Hockey League folded due to financial issues in 1977, Baltimore had no professional hockey team based in the city. A group of 22 businessmen formed the Baltimore Hockey Advocates in 1979, and raised  to purchase an expansion team for Baltimore. The Eastern Hockey League (EHL) granted the Advocates an expansion team on September 12, 1979, which revived the Baltimore Clippers name. Three previous professional hockey teams in Baltimore had used the name, including the Baltimore Clippers (1945–1949), the Baltimore Clippers (1954–1956), and the Baltimore Clippers (1962–1977). The Clippers name paid homage to local history in the Baltimore Clipper, and the Port of Baltimore. The newest Clippers played in the EHL for two seasons, and were affiliated as a farm team of the Minnesota North Stars of the National Hockey League from 1979 to 1981. The team played in green, white and gold uniform colors, the same as its parent team in Minnesota.

Gene Ubriaco was the team's first head coach. He had played left wing for the previous Clippers during the 1967–68 AHL season, and retired as a player in 1970. During the 1979–80 season, he briefly came out of retirement and played four minutes as an emergency goaltender, stopping all three shots he faced. In a home game on March 8, 1980, the Clippers defeated the Utica Mohawks 5–4 in overtime. Spectators were excited by fighting between the teams and threw beer and other debris onto ice surface, which resulted in injuries and at least one arrest. The Clippers won 41 games in the team's first season, tied for a second-place finish and five wins behind the first-place team. Warren Young was the team's highest-scoring center, and led the league with 53 goals scored. 
  
In the 1980–81 season, the Clippers dropped to fourth place, winning 29 games. Defenseman Gerry Ciarcia, tied for the league lead with 68 assists. In the 1981 playoffs, the Clippers faced the first place Erie Blades and lost all four games in the series. In June 1981, the North Stars named Ubriaco coach and general manager of the Nashville South Stars in the Central Hockey League. On July 19, 1981, EHL team owners mutually agreed to fold the league, and begin a new league.

Atlantic Coast Hockey League

The Atlantic Coast Hockey League (ACHL) was founded in 1981 to replace the EHL. The Advocates raised another US$100,000 to help establish the new league. Advocates' president John Haas stated the ACHL was set up "primarily to pay the financial obligations" of the EHL. The Advocates also rebranded the team to Baltimore Skipjacks, to avoid paying US$10,000 in trademark rights for the Clippers' name. The team name had maritime origins in the skipjack boat, which later became one of the state symbols of Maryland in 1985. The Skipjacks did not affiliate as an NHL farm team during the season, and chose a green and white color scheme without the gold color used by the North Stars. The Skipjacks unveiled a new logo which resembled a ship's wheel, with the team name spelled out with ropes.

On September 26, 1981, the new team name was announced, and Moose Lallo was named the team's new head coach who agreed to a one-year contract. He had won two championships during twenty years of coaching in the International Hockey League. The new Skipjacks finished third place in the 1981–82 ACHL season. Jim Stewart was named an ACHL first team all-star, as the league's best goaltender. In the 1982 playoffs, Baltimore faced the second place Mohawk Valley Stars. In a high-scoring series with 72 goals, the Stars prevailed in seven games.

American Hockey League

Penguins' affiliate

Skipjacks team owners continued to lobby for an American Hockey League team in Baltimore. In 1982, the Pittsburgh Penguins relocated their farm team and merged the Erie Blades into the ACHL's Skipjacks, with a three-year affiliation commitment to the Skipjacks. Coach Lou Angotti and sixteen Erie players made the move to Baltimore. The Skipjacks had an uphill battle in the new league as they shared the same arena with the Baltimore Blast of the Major Indoor Soccer League. The hockey team was consistently outdrawn by the soccer team and given second choice for nights of play. The Skipjacks also had a secondary farm team affiliation with the Boston Bruins for the 1982–83 AHL season. Mike Gillis led the team in scoring with 113 points. Mitch Lamoureux led the league with 57 goals, and won the Dudley "Red" Garrett Memorial Award as the AHL Rookie of the Year. Defenseman Greg Tebbutt won the Eddie Shore Award as the AHL Defenseman of the Year. Lamoureux improved the offense, but the Skipjacks finished the season in fifth place and missed the playoffs.

The Skipjacks went into the 1983–84 AHL season affiliated only with Pittsburgh. The Skipjacks unveiled a new logo for the season (shown in infobox) which resembled the word "JACKS" superimposed on a ship's wheel, and used the same black, gold and white color scheme of the Penguins. Ubriaco was brought back as head coach, and led the team to its best record with 102 points, and 384 goals scored. The Skipjacks won the John D. Chick Trophy as the regular season champions of the AHL's south division. The offense was evenly spread out, with 18 different players scoring at least 10 goals, and Paul Gardner led the team with 81 points. The Skipjacks were bolstered by the conscious decision of the Penguins to keep its prospects in the AHL, in an effort to finish last in the 1983–84 NHL season and win the right to select Mario Lemieux first overall in the 1984 NHL Entry Draft. In the playoffs, the Skipjacks defeated the fourth place Springfield Indians in four straight games, then waited 15 days for the second round start as Rochester Americans and St. Catharines Saints series went the full seven games. The layoff possibly affected the Skipjacks, as they lost to Rochester in six games in the second round. After the season, Ubriaco was given the Louis A. R. Pieri Memorial Award as the AHL's Coach of the Year.

In the 1984–85 AHL season, the Skipjacks won a league record 16 consecutive games during February and March.  The Skipjacks featured seven different players with 20-goal seasons. However, they were a more defensive oriented team than previous seasons, conceding only 252 goals, while scoring 326, and finishing second place in the south division with 98 points. The defense was led by captain Steve Carlson, and goaltender Jon Casey, on loan from the Minnesota North Stars. Casey led the league with the lowest goals against average to win the Harry "Hap" Holmes Memorial Award, and was voted the AHL's best goaltender, winning the Aldege "Baz" Bastien Memorial Award. In the playoffs, the Skipjacks defeated Rochester in the first round by four games to one, and then won all four games against the first place Binghamton Whalers in the second round. The Skipjacks' offense was shut down in the finals by rookie 19-year-old goaltender Patrick Roy, and the team lost in six games to the Sherbrooke Canadiens.

The Skipjacks struggled in the 1985–86 AHL season, even though Ubriaco stayed when many players moved up to the NHL. The offense was led by Tom Roulston with 38 goals, and 87 points. The team finished seventh place in the southern division, missing the playoffs. In the 1986–87 AHL season, Ubriaco improved the team to fifth place in the southern division, but still missed the playoffs. Alain Lemieux led the team with 41 goals and 97 points. The Penguins announced after the season, that they would not renew the affiliation agreement.

Unaffiliated season
Baltimore needed to find a new source of money, without the financial help from the Penguins. Businessman Tom Ebright purchased the team for $250,000, and operated it as an independent franchise, without an NHL farm team affiliation for the 1987–88 AHL season. The Skipjacks began the season with sixteen consecutive losses, and finished last in the AHL with 35 points, missing the playoffs. The team's leading player was center Doug Shedden, who scored 37 goals, and 88 points on the season.

Capitals' affiliate

The Washington Capitals began a five-year farm team affiliation with the Skipjacks in the 1988–89 AHL season. The Skipjacks logo was switched to a red, white and blue color scheme to match the Washington Capitals. Terry Murray was appointed the new head coach, and improved the team record to 30 wins, but the Skipjacks missed the playoffs for a fourth consecutive season. Centerman Mike Richard led the team in scoring with 44 goals, and 107 points, Mike Millar scored 47 goals, and Scott McCrory added 37 goals.

The Skipjacks began the 1989–90 AHL season with a 26–17–2 record, before head coach Terry Murray was promoted to the NHL, and replaced by Doug MacLean. The Skipjacks finished the season with 43 wins, and a third-place finish in the southern division. Goaltender Jim Hrivnak won 24 games, and earned four shutouts, and Mike Richard led the team in scoring again with 41 goals, and 83 points. In the playoffs, the Skipjacks defeated the second place Adirondack Red Wings in six games, in the first round, then lost to the first place Rochester Americans in six games in the second round.

In the 1990–91 AHL season, Rob Laird became the team's new head coach. Kenny Albert began his professional broadcasting career as the play-by-play announcer of the Skipjacks in 1990. The offense was led by Alfie Turcotte with 33 goals, and 85 points, and Jim Hrvniak won 20 games in goal. The Skipjacks finished third place in the regular season, received a bye in the first round, then faced the Binghamton Rangers in round two of the playoffs, losing in six games.

The league realigned into three divisions for the 1991–92 AHL season, with the Skipjacks remaining in the southern division. Washington also allocated the Hampton Roads Admirals of the East Coast Hockey League, as a farm team for the Skipjacks. The offense was led by Simon Wheeldon with 38 goals and 91 points, in addition to John Purves, and Reggie Savage, having 40-plus goal seasons. Despite the goal scoring, the Skipjacks struggled in the new division placing fifth, and out of the playoffs.

In the 1992–93 AHL season, Barry Trotz became the new head coach. The offense was led by John Byce with 35 goals, and 79 points, and goaltender Byron Dafoe played 48 of 80 games. The Skipjacks finished the season fourth place in the southern division, and faced first place Binghamton in the playoffs. The Skipjacks extended the series to seven games against the top team in the league, but lost 5–3 in the deciding game. After the season, owner Tom Ebright relocated the team to Portland, Maine, after losing an estimated $2.5 million after six seasons in based in Baltimore.

Coaches
The Skipjacks and Clippers had seven different head coaches in fourteen seasons of play. Gene Ubriaco coached seven seasons in Baltimore, and won the Louis A. R. Pieri Memorial Award as American Hockey League Coach of the Year in the 1983–84 season. Five of the seven Baltimore coaches, were also head coaches of NHL teams, including Ubriaco, Angotti, Murray, MacLean, and Trotz.

Players

Skipjacks alumni include over 140 players who also had NHL careers. Jim Stewart was the only player from the ACHL Skipjacks to play in the NHL. Thirteen players from the EHL Clippers went onto NHL careers. Mitch Lamoureux is the Baltimore Skipjacks career leader in goals (119), assists (133), and points (252). He was inducted into the AHL Hall of Fame in the class of 2011. Three Skipjacks also won season awards:

Results
Season-by-season results in the regular season, and playoffs.

References

 
1981 establishments in Maryland
1993 disestablishments in Maryland
Boston Bruins minor league affiliates
Eastern Hockey League (1978–1981) teams
Minnesota North Stars minor league affiliates
Pittsburgh Penguins minor league affiliates
Ice hockey clubs established in 1981
Ice hockey teams in Maryland
Sports clubs disestablished in 1993
Washington Capitals minor league affiliates